Valora or valora' may also refer to:
 Valora (Portugal)
 Valora (company)
 Valora, currency unit in the Republic of Molossia
 Valora Noland